Class 74 may refer to:
NSB Class 74, a Norwegian passenger train.
 British Rail Class 74, a British electro-diesel locomotive
 DRG Class 74, a class of German 2-6-0 passenger tank locomotives operated by the Deutsche Reichsbahn comprising:
 Class 74.0-3: Prussian T 11, PKP Class OKi1
 Class 74.3: LBE T 10
 Class 74.4-13: Prussian T 12, PKP Class OKi2, SNCB 69, SNCF 130 TC
 Class 74.66: various locomotives taken over by the East German Deutsche Reichsbahn in 1949
 Class 74.67: ditto